Samsung S5560 (also known as Samsung Marvel) was announced in October 2009 and released in November 2009 as part of a range of touch-screen phones released by Samsung. It sits between the Tocco Lite and the Samsung Jet.

Specifications
3-inch touchscreen
5-megapixel camera with LED flash and autofocus
Smile and Blink detection, with image stabilization 
WiFi connectivity
Stereo FM radio with RDS and 3.5mm audio jack
Widgets - Facebook, Orkut, Picassa, etc.
Long Battery Life (up 9 hours)
Touch Wiz & Accelerator
resolution of 240 x 400 pixels.
78 MB Internal memory

Limitations
Limited In-Call Menu options

References

s-8000
Mobile phones introduced in 2009